Ibn Mu'adh, meaning the son of Mu'adh, may refer to:

 Sa'd ibn Mu'adh: a companion of the Islamic prophet Muhammad.
 Ibn Muʿādh al-Jayyānī
 Yahya ibn Mu'adh al-Razi